Svetoslav Denchev Luchnikov (family name occasionally also transliterated as Lutschnikov) (3 February 1922 – 27 October 2002) was a Bulgarian jurist and politician who served as the Minister of Justice and Deputy Prime Minister in the Dimitrov cabinet between 8 November 1991 and 30 December 1992.

Biography 
He was a graduate of Sofia University, where he earned a degree in legal studies. Luchnikov joined the UDF shortly after the collapse of the communist system in Bulgaria and was a member of four National Parliaments (36th /1991 — 1994/; 37th /1995 — 1997/; 38th /1997 — 2001/; 39th /2001 — until his death/). He was one of the key figures behind the drafting of the restitution law in Bulgaria.

References 

Bulgarian jurists
Members of the National Assembly (Bulgaria)
Union of Democratic Forces (Bulgaria) politicians
Sofia University alumni
People from Ruse, Bulgaria
1922 births
2002 deaths
Justice ministers of Bulgaria